The Royal Aal al-Bayt Institute for Islamic Thought  (abbr. RABIIT) is an international Islamic non-governmental, independent institute in Amman, Jordan.
It is affiliated with the Royal Islamic Strategic Studies Centre.

The late King Hussein Bin Talal established the Institute in 1980, and entrusted it to Prince Hassan bin Talal. It passed on to Crown Prince Hamzah bin Al Hussein on August 8, 1999, and then to Prince Ghazi bin Muhammad, who is the chair of the Board of Trustees.

Fellows of the Institute attend a conference every 2–3 years. The last one was held in September 2010, under the title "Islam and the Environment".

The institute was the leading sponsor of the statements, The Amman Message and A Common Word Between Us and You.

References

External links 
 The Royal Aal al-Bayt Institute for Islamic Thought
 Welcome to The Royal Islamic Strategic Studies Centre

Islamic organisations based in Jordan